Sumlinia halophila is a species of beetles in the family Cicindelidae, the only species in the genus Sumlinia.

References

Cicindelidae